The COVID-19 pandemic reached the province of Jilin, China.

Statistics

Timeline

2020
On February 24, the spokesperson of the Yanbian State Government stated that it will strengthen the joint prevention and control of customs, disease control, and public security inspections at the airport. People arriving from South Korea will be picked up by counties and cities in a unified manner, and relatives and friends will not be able to pick them up at the airport. Scenic spots in Yanbian Prefecture were temporarily closed, and travel agencies did not accept or organize groups.

On May 9, in response to a new domestic primary confirmed case in Shulan City, the 2019-nCoV epidemic situation grading standard in Shulan City was raised from low risk to medium risk; the next day, due to 11 new confirmed cases in Shulan City, the risk level of Lanzhou City had been raised again, from medium risk to high risk. Some local railway trains were suspended, all bus routes in the city suspended services, and taxis were not allowed to operate across regions. Shulan City also adopted the strictest control measures. The local area adopted closed management of various communities and villages, and conducted blanket screening of all people in the city, focusing on screening people returning to Shulan from key domestic areas and overseas, and at the same time stopping all gathering activities ; All public services and entertainment venues were closed. In principle, catering units were prohibited from dine-in, and any unit or individual was prohibited from holding any form of gatherings, but takeaway services could be provided. Students in the third and third grades who have returned to school will resume online teaching. At the Jilin Provincial Epidemic Prevention and Control Video Conference, Bayin Chaolu, Secretary of the CPC Jilin Provincial Party Committee and Leader of the Provincial Epidemic Prevention and Control Leading Group, said that it is necessary to learn from the lessons of the clustered epidemic in Shulan City and quickly take strict and effective measures, go all out to stabilize the epidemic situation, and resolutely prevent the spread of the epidemic. The steering group of the National Health and Medical Commission to the three northeastern provinces for epidemic prevention and control and the China Center for Disease Control and Prevention arrived in Jilin City and Shulan City on the same day to supervise the epidemic prevention and control command; before May 8, the vice governor of Jilin Province, An Lijia, the executive deputy head of the Provincial Leading Group for Epidemic Prevention and Control, led officials in charge of health, public security, and disease control to Shulan City as soon as possible to supervise the epidemic prevention and control work on the spot.

On May 12, Jiaohe City issued a notice that all those who participated in the wedding were required to be quarantined due to the confirmed diagnosis of a wedding photographer held locally.

From May 19th, the urban bus passenger transport service in Jiaohe City was suspended.

On May 21, all barber shops, nail salons, beauty salons, bathing pools, foot baths (pediatric shops), and other places where people gather in Jilin City were closed until further notice.

On May 22, the Jilin City Epidemic Prevention and Control Work Leading Group decided to prohibit residents of Jilin City from entering Beijing from then until the epidemic risk level would be lifted.

On May 23, the Office of the Leading Group for the Prevention and Control of Novel Coronavirus Pneumonia in Jilin Province issued a notice to severely deal with and severely crack down on serious violations in the prevention and control of the epidemic.

From June 7, all road checkpoints in the urban area of Jilin City were cancelled and expressway checkpoints resumed normal traffic. At the same time, communities with no confirmed cases or those with confirmed cases that have been closed for more than 28 days were released from closed management; communities with confirmed cases that have been closed for less than 28 days continued to implement closed management. Residents of the community can travel with a pass, and implemented temperature measurement and code scanning until the 28th day.

At 5 o'clock on June 8, Jilin Station resumed the departure business of some trains.

As of 24:00 on July 26, Jilin Province had no new imported confirmed cases for 86 consecutive days. The province had reported a total of 19 confirmed cases imported from abroad, and a total of 19 cases had been cured and discharged. From 00:00 to 24:00 on July 26, there were 2 newly imported confirmed cases in Dalian (2 cases in Siping City) in the whole province, all of whom were asymptomatic infections imported from the Dalian epidemic situation notified by Jilin Province on July 25.

2021
From 16:00 on January 16, in the Laoan District of Xinghua Community, Fanjiatun Town, Gongzhuling City, Dongsheng Community Sugar Research Community, Fumin Community Xinxin Home Community, Harmonious Community Erxie Hat Community, Dongsheng Community Sugar Research Institute Civilized Community, The Grain Depot Family Building Community in Yongsheng Community, the Yishui Family Building Community in Kaixuan Community, and the Sunshine Community in Harmony Community have been adjusted to medium-risk areas. In this super spread, health care centers in Changchun and Tonghua organized training and teaching activities to sell products.Liu Shunchang, deputy director of the Jilin Provincial Department of Market Supervision, said that the relevant departments of the two places have launched a joint investigation, and severe penalties will be imposed for any violations of laws and regulations.  On the same day, the Fuyu Municipal Commission for Discipline Inspection reported that nine officials were punished for violating work discipline during the epidemic prevention period, including dereliction of duty and poor leadership. Starting from the 18th, residents of Gongzhuling City were to undergo free nucleic acid sampling and testing for the new coronavirus. All communities, communities, family homes, and rural residents in Gongzhuling City were not allowed to move around. All residents were isolated at home and were strictly prohibited from leaving the house. Daily necessities were purchased by the on-duty personnel in villages and communities.

On January 21, Building 7 of Xinnong Community in Songyuan Economic and Technological Development Zone was adjusted to a medium-risk area.

On January 23, Tonghua City notified that 14 party members and cadres, including the director of the Municipal Health and Health Commission, the director of the Municipal Center for Disease Control and Prevention, and the deputy director of the Municipal Transportation Bureau, were held accountable for failing to monitor imported cases from outside the province and failing to perform their duties. Many people were punished by the party and dismissed from the party.

On January 25, the Changchun Municipal Commission for Discipline Inspection and Supervision held accountable eight party members and cadres who failed to perform their duties, neglected supervision, and neglected duties in the prevention and control of the epidemic in Gongzhuling City.

In mid-February, the Chinese Center for Disease Control and Prevention published a paper in its official English journal, disclosing the details of the super-spreading epidemic that broke out in Jilin earlier. During the promotional activities, at least 141 related cases of infection were caused. According to the paper, due to muscle pain and other symptoms, Lin went to a pharmacy to buy medicine and then gave three lectures on two consecutive days. The doors and windows of the venue where the lecture was closed, and Lin Nan did not wear a mask. The majority of those who attended the lectures were elderly, with a median age of 72. According to earlier reports, the lecture was touted as a gift of eggs, which attracted many elders. In addition, the lectures took a long time and took place in a small confined space. Participants lacked personal protection measures and did not maintain social distancing.

From 22:00 on February 20, Bordeaux Town Community, Ziyou Zizhai Community in Jiangnan Community, Minzhu Street, Dongchang District, Family Building of Shengli Community Public Utilities Bureau in Xinzhan Street, Zhongan Xinsheng District A in Xinxing Community, and Yindu Mansion Community in Xinshan Community 5 communities had been adjusted to low-risk areas; Dongchang District had no new confirmed cases for 14 consecutive days, and the whole area had been adjusted to low-risk areas simultaneously.At the time, there were no medium or high risk areas in Jilin Province.

2022
On March 2, Keying International Trading Co., Ltd. in the coastal sub-district cooperation zone of Hunchun City was designated as a medium-risk area, and many places were designated as closed or controlled areas.

From March 4th, all enclosed spaces in Yanji City were closed, off-campus training institutions were to suspend offline education and teaching activities, daycare institutions suspended offline services, religious places suspended opening to the public and collective religious activities, and activity venues suspended entertainment, singing and dancing, and performances. There was also closed management of welfare homes, nursing homes, prisons, and mental health institutions.

On March 10, Zhang Lifeng, Secretary of the Party Committee of Jilin Institute of Agricultural Science and Technology, who had clustered infections, was dismissed due to poor command of epidemic prevention work. The Jilin Provincial Committee of the Chinese Communist Party (CCP) decided that Yue Qiang, the chief inspector of the Jilin Provincial People's Government and a member of the party group of the Provincial Department of Education, will concurrently serve as the party secretary of Jilin Agricultural Science and Technology College.

On March 11, the Changchun City Epidemic Prevention and Control Headquarters announced that starting from then on, three rounds of nucleic acid testing for all employees would be launched within Changchun City with the implementation of closed management.

On March 14, Jilin Province banned the movement of people across provinces, cities, and prefectures.

On March 17, the Jilin Provincial Commission for Discipline Inspection made a public report on the handling of 16 party members and cadres and public officials in the epidemic prevention and control work in Changchun City and Jilin City.

On March 19, the Jilin Provincial Committee of the CCP decided that Lu Qinglong would be the Secretary of the Changyi District Committee of Jilin City and removed Liu Gefeng from the post of Secretary of the Changyi District Committee of Jilin City; Liu Huijun would be the Secretary of the Chuanying District Committee of Jilin City Secretary of Chuanying District Committee.

On April 28, the Office of the Leading Group for the Prevention and Control of New Coronavirus Pneumonia in Changchun City issued a notice: After research by the Leading Group for Epidemic Prevention and Control in Changchun City, from 0:00 on April 28 (Kuancheng District was postponed to 0:00 on the 29th due to nucleic acid testing) ), would gradually and orderly restore the normal order of production and life in Changchun City, and take the following measures: 1. Personnel returning to work, production, business, and markets, and returning to work in the prevention area of the main urban area (including "epidemic-free areas") should travel as much as possible. For other residents, when going out only one person per household would travel per day, and should not leave the main urban area unless necessary. Residents of county-level prevention areas (including "epidemic-free communities") are allowed to move within the county, and should not leave the county (city) area where they are located unless necessary. The community would strictly implement "one door to enter and exit", and would be on duty 24 hours a day. Outsiders are strictly prohibited from entering unless there are special circumstances. 2. The personnel of party and government agencies, enterprises, and institutions shall implement the "two points and one line" commuting mode (except for closed and controlled areas). Employees in closed and controlled areas that meet the conditions for resuming work and production can only go out and not enter, and the company will continue to implement closed management; the prevention area should be fully released, and a "point-to-point" method of commuting to and from work should be adopted. Enterprises resuming business and remarketing should strictly implement the detection system of "early antigen and late nucleic acid" for employees. Enterprises resuming business and remarketing must strictly implement temperature measurement by scanning codes, wearing masks, limiting traffic and distance, and controlling the gathering of personnel. 3. Small supermarkets, barber shops, laundromats, auto repair shops, maternity and baby product stores, and other service industries in the prevention zone that are closely related to people's lives will resume business under the premise of strictly implementing epidemic prevention and control measures. The dine-in service of catering service units will be suspended, and services will be provided by ordering online, picking up at the store, and delivering food to the community. 4. Entertainment and leisure places such as Internet cafes, bars, KTV, dance halls, electronic game (game) halls, swimming pools, bathing pools, foot therapy shops, billiard halls, chess and card rooms, beauty treatment, physiotherapy, massage, fitness centers, gymnasiums, lottery stations, etc. Gathering business places, libraries, museums, cultural centers (stations), theaters, and other closed cultural activity places are temporarily closed to the public. Tourist scenic spots (scenic spots) and rural tourism units are temporarily closed to the outside world. 5. Rail transit is not in operation for the time being, and 175 bus lines will resume operation. Passengers scan the QR code to board the bus, and strictly implement the requirements of wearing masks, boarding with a limited distance, and limited traffic. Key epidemic prevention groups and "red and yellow code" personnel are prohibited from taking public transportation. 6. Schools of all kinds will be allowed to start school only after they pass the system assessment and check-ups one by one. 7. The general public should consciously do a good job of personal protection, do not gather, wash hands frequently, ventilate frequently, share meals, use serving chopsticks, and two-meter noodles. Adhere to "postpone weddings, brief funerals, and no banquets". 8. It is forbidden to hold large-scale conferences, forums, performances, and other gathering activities. 9. Those who refuse to implement the provisions of the notice will be punished in accordance with relevant laws and regulations. 

In May, a citizen of Siping City, Jilin Province, missed the 25th round of nucleic acid testing on May 19. Although he had retested on May 20, he was still required to pay the cost of the previous 24 nucleic acid tests. The local responded that it was an "attitude problem" for the citizen to miss the nucleic acid test. As of May 16, Siping City had reprimanded 390 people who did not participate in the nucleic acid test and charged 470 people for supplementary testing.

From June 20th to 22nd, Jilin City carried out all-area nucleic acid testing in the urban area for three consecutive days.

On September 6, during the epidemic period, Changchun City and relevant departments and units failed to implement the "quartet responsibilities" for epidemic prevention and control, and committed dereliction of duty in terms of nosocomial infection prevention and control, nucleic acid testing, and closed-loop management with varying degrees of treatment.

Starting from November 14, Yanji City stopped nucleic acid testing for all employees.

References 

Jilin
Jilin
History of Jilin
Health in Jilin
zh:2019冠状病毒病吉林省疫情